Peder Rudolph Lykkeberg (11 February 1878 in Skanderborg – 23 December 1944 in Copenhagen) was a Danish swimmer who competed at the 1900 Summer Olympics. He won the bronze medal in the underwater swimming competition. This event was held only in 1900. Lykkeberg had the longest time underwater (90.0 seconds compared to the winner's 68.4 seconds) and swam further than the other contestants (covering more than the winner's 60.00 metres), but Lykkeberg swam in a circle—and the distance for the scoring in the event was measured as a straight line from the starting point, resulting in his distance being credited as only 28.50 metres.

References

External links
 

1878 births
1944 deaths
Danish male swimmers
Olympic swimmers of Denmark
Swimmers at the 1900 Summer Olympics
Olympic bronze medalists for Denmark
Olympic bronze medalists in swimming
Medalists at the 1900 Summer Olympics
People from Skanderborg Municipality
Sportspeople from the Central Denmark Region